The Military ranks of Somalia are the military insignia used by the Somali Armed Forces. Being a former Italian protectorate, Somalia shares a rank structure similar to that of Italy.

The highest rank is lieutenant general. The current person holding this rank is Bashir Mohamed Jama, former head of the Somali Custodial Corps.

Commissioned officer ranks
The rank insignia of commissioned officers.

Other ranks
The rank insignia of non-commissioned officers and enlisted personnel.

References

External links
 

Somalia
Military of Somalia